Pure Fucking Mayhem is a 2008 documentary created by Stefan Rydehed which gives an inside look at the second wave Norwegian black metal band Mayhem. The movie includes interviews with the band members as well as some previously unseen pictures of the early black metal scene.

Cast

Narration 
Kajsa Rydehed

Interviewees 
Necrobutcher
Manheim
Occultus
Attila Csihar

Archive footage
Euronymous
Messiah
Dead
Count Grishnackh
Blasphemer

References

External links
Pure Fucking Mayhem at Discogs
 Pure Fucking Mayhem at IMDb

2008 films
Documentary films about heavy metal music and musicians
Mayhem (band)
2000s English-language films